The Hinteregg is a mountain of the Plessur Alps, overlooking Fideris in the canton of Graubünden, Switzerland.

References

External links
 Hinteregg on Hikr

Mountains of the Alps
Mountains of Switzerland
Mountains of Graubünden
Two-thousanders of Switzerland